The Free Iraqi Army (Al-Jayš Al-‘Irāqī  Al-Ḥurr, FIA) was a Sunni rebel group formed in the western Sunni-majority provinces of Iraq from Iraqi supporters of the Free Syrian Army rebels fighting in the Syrian Civil War. The group aimed to overthrow the Shia-dominated government of Iraq, believing that they would gain support in this from Syria should the rebels be successful in overthrowing Bashar al-Assad. An Iraqi counterterror spokesman denied this, saying that the name is merely being used by al-Qaeda in Iraq to "attract the support of the Iraqi Sunnis by making use of the strife going on in Syria."

Aside from Anbar Province, the FIA reportedly had a presence in Fallujah, along the Syrian border near the town of Al-Qaim, and in Mosul in the north of Iraq. A recruiting commander for the group told a reporter from The Daily Star newspaper in Lebanon that the group was opposed to both Al-Qaeda in Iraq and their opponents in the Sahwa militia. The same commander claimed that the group received financial support from cross-border tribal extensions and Sunni sympathizers in the Persian gulf states of Qatar, Saudi Arabia, and the UAE.

On 4 February 2013, Wathiq al-Batat of the Shiite militant group Hezbollah in Iraq, announced the formation of the Mukhtar Army to fight against al-Qaeda and the Free Iraqi Army. In August 2014, the group became defunct, after a large offensive by ISIL in northern Iraq, with activity on their websites ceasing.

Links to al-Qaeda and the Iraqi Ba'athists
Despite the group's denial of links to al-Qaeda, the group had been accused of being affiliated with the group. These accusations of links with both al-Qaeda and the Ba'athists led to a Najaf Shiite figure associated with the State of Law Coalition issuing a fatwa against supplying the group with weapons.

See also 

 List of armed groups in the Iraqi Civil War

External links
 Free Iraqi Army on YouTube

References

Arab militant groups
War in Iraq (2013–2017)
Iraqi insurgency (2011–2013)
Rebel groups in Iraq
Anti-government factions of the Syrian civil war
2012 establishments in Iraq
Military units and formations established in 2012